Guerette is a surname. Notable people with the surname include:

Michelle Guerette (born 1980), American rower
Patrick Guérette (1918–1997), Canadian politician